Jimmy Sham Tsz-kit (born 29 June 1987) is a Hong Kong pro-democracy and LGBT rights activist. He served as a convener for the pro-democracy organisation Civil Human Rights Front (CHRF) until October 2020 and serves as a secretary for the LGBT rights organisation Rainbow of Hong Kong. He is a longtime member of the League of Social Democrats. In 2019 he was elected to the Sha Tin District Council by residents of Lek Yuen constituency, but he resigned from this position in July 2021 amidst a government crackdown on pro-democracy councillors.

Biography 
Sham grew up in a single-parent family and completed secondary school in 2006. He worked as a legislative assistant for a period after graduating from secondary school. He later joined Rainbow Action, a member organisation of Civil Human Rights Front that advocates for LGBT rights. He started assisting with CHRF's work in 2008, hosting events and managing affairs with human and police rights. He occupied Connaught Road Central along with other protesters after the 1July march in 2011, after which he was arrested for unlawful assembly. He participated in the 2014 Hong Kong protests and became CHRF's convener in 2015, for one year.

After Sham left the post of convener, he studied at the Hong Kong Community College, graduating in October 2018 with a higher diploma in social work. He immediately rejoined CHRF, again as convener. This came at a difficult time for the organisation, as it had only  in funding with a monthly expenditure of HK$20,000. He is a longtime member of the League of Social Democrats and joined its executive committee in 2018. He first joined the party because it was the first in Hong Kong to include LGBT issues in its platform.

In 2020, Time magazine named Sham one of "20 people to watch", the only Hong Kong citizen on the list. He responded, "Hong Kong people deserve more attention from the outside world than themselves."

Sexuality 
Sham is openly gay; he married his husband, a flight attendant, in New York in 2014. He is an active campaigner for LGBT rights in Hong Kong. As a secretary, he manages daily operations for Rainbow of Hong Kong, helps organise annual LGBT rallies and hosted an LGBT programme on Citizens' Radio. Sham was also the spokesperson for the 2018 Hong Kong Pride Parade, which drew 12,000 people, a record high.

Sham has resorted to the courts to have his New York marriage recognised in Hong Kong. In September 2020, he lost his first judicial review, and lost the case before the Court of Appeal in August 2022, while awaiting trial over the mass national security law case. On 11 November 2022, Sham's lawyer Hectar Pun resorted to the High Court as a last resort for his petition to be heard, after a panel of three judges determined that the matter was of "great general public importance".

2019–2020 Hong Kong protests 

As convener of Civil Human Rights Front, Sham helped organise the first and second protest marches against the 2019 Hong Kong extradition bill on 31 March and 28 April, and helped organise the protest march against the bill on 9June. The number of participants at this march exceeded his expectations: CHRF set a target of 300,000 protesters, and he estimated that more than a million people participated. On 13 June, after the Hong Kong government's announcement of its intention to restart debating the bill, as well as the clashes at the Legislative Council (LegCo), Sham decided to organize another protest march on 16 June, which meant they had only four days to advertise it. He estimated that there were close to two million participants at the 16 June protest. Sham noted that CHRF is unable to mobilise large numbers of people to participate in protests, and that the high number of protesters in the 2019 protests was caused by public awareness and poor governance by the Hong Kong government. He described CHRF's role in the protests as providing a platform for citizens to express their views. He said that CHRF estimates participants at protests by counting the participants from footbridges. Sham organised the 1July march in 2019, demanding a full retraction of the amendment bill and for Chief Executive Carrie Lam to step down.

2019 District Council elections 

Sham was elected to the Sha Tin District Council during the 2019 District Council elections. He represents the pro-democracy League of Social Democrats in Lek Yuen constituency. His campaign activities were temporarily disrupted by the October 2019 attack, but he returned to the streets to campaign on crutches. Sham was elected on 24 November 2019, unseating incumbent Michael Wong Yue-hon of the pro-Beijing Civil Force.

2020 pro-democracy primaries 
Sham ran as a candidate of the League of Social Democrats for Kowloon West during the pro-democracy primaries of July 2020 and won the election with 24,144 votes, 31.82% of the electorate.

2020 legislative council election 
On 30 July 2020, 12 candidates were disqualified by the Hong Kong government, and it was also announced that the rest of the candidacies were still being reviewed, with some saying that most of the pro-democracy camp were to be disqualified.

On 31 July, Chief Executive Carrie Lam announced that due to the COVID-19 pandemic in Hong Kong, the elections would be postponed for a year without setting a new date.

On 3 August, HK01 reported that Sham and other four others had also been disqualified. Sham said that he was not afraid of disqualification and that he would continue his protests against the national security law. He also received a letter from the electoral commission telling him his nomination was being reviewed.

2021 National Security Law arrest 

On 6 January 2021, Sham was arrested along with more than 50 other people accused of violating the national security law. They were all accused of trying to "overthrow" the government and "subversion." Sham was released on bail on 7 January.

On 28 February 2021, Sham, along with 46 others, was formally charged with "subversion" and arrested again. On 4 March, he was denied bail and remained in prison. On 12 March, an upper court denied him bail again, citing national security risks. On 29 March 2021, the High Court adjourned his third bail application until 12 April after one-hour deliberation. Until then, Sham would remain in custody. On 12 April 2021, the High Court denied him bail and ordered him to remain in custody. Sham faces a possible life sentence if convicted of national security offences.

On 13 May 2021, High Court judge Esther Toh upheld her decision to deny bail to Sham arguing that he was a "determined and resolute young man" who could reoffend if granted bail.

On 2 September 2022, Sham pleaded guilty to violating the national security law.

Resignation as District Councillor 
On 8 July 2021, more than 76 district councilors resigned their positions, including Sham, citing imminent removal from office under a massive disqualification from the government based on violation of both the Basic Law and the national security law. The League of Social Democrats announced his resignation via a press release.

Harassment and physical attacks

Attack over sexual orientation 
On 7 July 2019, DAB politician and LegCo member Ann Chiang uploaded a video to Facebook slamming Sham for being gay and alleging that he intentionally concealed his sexuality to gain status with the pan-democracy camp in Hong Kong. The video showed him in drag at an event, with captions "Deliberately concealing that, for power, money or fame?" and "Corrupting social morals, just disgusting." Sham is openly gay and participates in LGBT rights organisations. He responded on social media, criticizing Chiang's attacks and encouraging those remaining in the closet not to feel ashamed of their sexuality. The video was instantly criticized by gay groups and was removed by Facebook for violating its community standards. On 19 July, Sham and LegCo member Raymond Chan Chi-chuen protested in front of the Equal Opportunities Commission together with a number of LGBT rights organisations. The pair submitted a petition with more than 2,000 signatures demanding that EOC chairman Ricky Chu Man-kin condemn Chiang's statements. Chiang later accused Sham of not being "ready" if he considered her comments to be an attack.

Sham was one of the coordinators of a demonstration on 8 December 2019. His attempts to communicate with the Hong Kong Police Force about the demonstration were rejected by the police, who called him a "damn gay man" (死基佬).

Attacks during the 2019–2020 Hong Kong protests 
On 29 August, around 30 people gathered near Rainbow of Hong Kong's headquarters in Jordan, Hong Kong at 11 a.m. for a "Denounce Civil Human Rights Front" demonstration. Sham said the organisers wrongly listed CHRF's address as Rainbow of Hong Kong, and arrived at the venue 10 minutes earlier to talk to the protesters. Some protesters said they were there to oppose CHRF and scolded Sham using foul language. They also pushed apart and scolded reporters there, saying reporters at the scene were "fake". Some supporters of Sham were at the scene as well. During the chaos, several plainclothes law enforcement officers who attempted to separate the two groups of people were also scolded. A group of protesters continued to chant slogans after Sham left the premises, and stopped only after passersby shouted at them to leave. Sham later explained that Rainbow of Hong Kong was not a member organisation of CHRF, and he thought it was funny that protesters insisted on staying there. At 12:50 p.m. that day, Sham and his friend Lo were assaulted by two masked men in a restaurant in Jordan with a softball bat and an iron tube. Sham's friend was hit three times in his arm resulting in swelling, and was sent to hospital; Sham was unharmed. Two men, aged 15 and 44, were later arrested over the attack.

On 16 October, while on the way to a CHRF meeting, Sham was attacked on the street with a hammer by four to five people in Tai Kok Tsui, Kowloon. He was taken, bleeding heavily, to Kwong Wah Hospital.

On 27 July 2020, the trial for the first attack began. The 15-year-old boy charged with attacking Sham and his friend in the first incident told the court that he was given HK$3,000 to attack him while the other defendant, a 29-year-old man, pleaded guilty to conspiracy to cause bodily harm. On 29 July, the 29-year-old said in court that a HK$2 million bounty was offered to "cripple" Sham saying that "some Hongkonger in Tuen Mun wanted to cripple his leg." On 21 September, the 29-year-old was sentenced to 46 months in prison and the teenager to a training centre.

References

1987 births
Living people
Gay politicians
Hong Kong democracy activists
Hong Kong LGBT politicians
Hong Kong LGBT rights activists
League of Social Democrats politicians
District councillors of Sha Tin District
Prisoners and detainees of Hong Kong
Hong Kong political prisoners
People convicted under the Hong Kong national security law